The Clermont Avenue Skating Rink was a sports arena on Clermont Avenue in Brooklyn, New York, United States. It was home to the Brooklyn Skating Club and the Brooklyn Crescents of the American Amateur Hockey League from 1896 to 1906.

The ice hockey team of the Brooklyn Skating Club folded in 1906 and the Brooklyn Crescents went on to play at the St. Nicholas Rink in Manhattan for the 1906–07 season as the Clermont Avenue Skating Rink instead was used for roller hockey.

References

Indoor ice hockey venues in the United States
Sports venues in Brooklyn
Defunct indoor arenas in the United States
Sports venues completed in 1916